Advent of... (full title Advent of the Nuclear Baphomet) is the fifth EP released by the Singaporean black metal artist Impiety. It was recorded in January 2011, and released on February 15, 2011. The mini-album was made available in super jewel box through Pulverised Records. Vinyl version was released by Agonia Records under licensed from Pulverised, limited to 800 copies with first 300 copies pressed on green, brown haze vinyl and the remaining 500 on regular olive green color. Both LP came with insert, A2 size poster and engraved B-sides.

Track listing

Credits 
Shyaithan – Vocals, bass, music and lyrics, producer
Eskathon – Lead solos, guitar
Kekko – Guitar
Atum – Drums and percussion
Nicolo Gasparini – Engineer
Alekht – Latin translation
Lord Sickness – Cover art
Lord Perversor – Layout
David Dornave – Live photos in Vienna, Austria during December 2010
Christophe Szpajdel – Logo

References 
 Official Pulverised Records

2011 EPs
Black metal EPs
Impiety (band) albums